Hope is a surname. Notable people with the surname include:

A
 A. D. Hope (1907–2000), Australian poet
 Adam Hope (1813–1882), Canadian politician
 Alan Hope, a.k.a. Howling Laud Hope, British politician
 Albert Hope, New Zealand rower
 Alexander Beresford Hope (1820–1887), British author and Conservative politician
 Amanda Hope (b. 1969), American model
 Anthony Hope (1863–1933), British novelist

B
 Barclay Hope (b. 1958), Canadian actor
 Bob Hope (1903–2003), British-American comedian and actor
 Bob Hope (Emmerdale), fictional character from Emmerdale
 Brian Hope-Taylor (1923–2001), British artist, archaeologist and broadcaster

C
 Carly Hope (born 1991), actress and daughter of Bob Hope
 Cat Hope, Australian musician and academic
 Charles Hope, Lord Granton (1763–1851), Scottish politician and judge
 Charles Hope, 1st Earl of Hopetoun (1681–1742), Scottish nobleman
 Chris Hope (b. 1980), American football player
 Chris Hope (footballer) (b. 1972), English footballer
 Christopher Hope (b. 1944), South African writer
 Clifford R. Hope (1893–1970), Republican representative from Kansas
 Connie Bea Hope (1904–1993), American television personality

D
 Daniel Hope (b. 1973), British-Irish classical violinist
 Danielle Hope (b. 1992), singer and actress
 Dave Hope (b. 1945), American bass guitar player
 David Hope, Baron Hope of Craighead (b. 1938), Scottish judge
 David Hope, Baron Hope of Thornes (b. 1940), Archbishop of York (1995–2005)
 Dolores Hope (1909-2011), singer, philanthropist and wife of Bob Hope
 Douglas Hope (1860 – 1918) pseudonym used by British composer Hilda Wilson

E
 Elizabeth Hope (1842–1922), British evangelist
 Elmo Hope (1923–1967), American jazz pianist
 Emma Hope (born 1962), British shoe designer
 Eric Hope (1915–1999), British pianist
 Esther Studholme Hope (née Baker, 1885–1975), New Zealand painter

F
 Francis Hope (1866–1941), English nobleman
 Frederick William Hope (1797–1862), English entomologist
 Fredric Hope (1900–1937), American film art director

G
 Gabrielle Hope (1916–1962), New Zealand painter
 George Hope (American football), American college football coach
 George Johnstone Hope (1767–1818), British naval officer

H
 Henry Hope (1735–1811), American born Dutch merchant banker
 Henry Hope (Quebec lieutenant governor)

J
 Jack Hope (1898–1962), English-born American film and television producer
 James Hope (disambiguation), several people
 Jimmy Hope (footballer) (1919–1979), Scottish footballer (Manchester City)
 Jimmy Hope (1836–1905), American burglar
 John Hope (disambiguation), several people including
 John Hope, Lord Hope (1794–1858), Lord Justice Clerk of Scotland 1841–58
 John Hope (educator) (1868–1936), African American educator
 John Hope (meteorologist) (1919–2002), American meteorologist
 John Hope, 1st Baron Glendevon (1912–1996), Scottish Tory politician
 John Hope, 1st Marquess of Linlithgow (1860–1908), Governor-General of Australia
 John Augustus Hope (1869–1924), British soldier and politician
 Josh Hope (b. 1998) Australian association football player
 Julian Hope, 2nd Baron Glendevon (1950–2009), British nobleman and opera producer

K
 Kara Hope, American politician
 Kyle Hope (born 1988), West Indian cricketer

L
 Leighton A. Hope (1921–1998), New York politician
 Leslie Hope (b. 1965), Canadian actress
 Leslie Townes Hope, birth name of Bob Hope

M
 Mark Hope (b. 1970), English footballer
 Maurice Hope (b. 1951), former English boxer

N
 Nellie A. Hope (1864-1918), American violinist, music teacher, orchestra conductor
 Nicholas Hope (b. 1958), English actor

O 
 Ole-Kristian Hope (b. ca 1965), Norwegian economist
 Olivia Hope, victim of a double murder in New Zealand

P
Peter Hope (diplomat) (1912–1999), British intelligence officer and ambassador
Peter Hope (born 1930), British composer and arranger
Peter Hope, 4th Baron Rankeillour (1935–2005)
Phil Hope (born 1955), British Labour Party politician
Philip Hope (1889–1962), English cricketer

R
 Randy Hope (b. 1959), Canadian politician
 Reg Hope (b. 1927), Australian politician
 Richard Hope (disambiguation), several people
 Robert Hope-Jones (1859–1914), inventor of the theatre organ

S 
 Shai Hope (b. 1993) Barbados And West Indies cricket player

T
 Tamara Hope (b. 1984), Canadian actress
 Tanya Hope, Indian actress
 Ted Hope (b. 1962), American film producer
 Theodore Hope (lawyer)
 Teri Hope (b. 1939), American model and actress
 Thomas Hope (disambiguation), several people

V
 Vick Hope (born 1989), English television and radio presenter
 Victor Hope, 2nd Marquess of Linlithgow (1887–1952), British statesman

W
 Wally Hope (1947–1975), British underground culture guru
 William Hope (disambiguation), several people, including:
 Sir William Henry St John Hope (1854–1919), English archaeologist and antiquarian
 William Hope (actor) (b. 1955), Canadian actor
 William Hope (paranormal investigator) (1863–1933), pioneer 'spirit photographer'

See also
 Hope (disambiguation)
 Lord Hope (disambiguation)

English-language surnames